Bhoopathi is a 1997 Indian Malayalam film, directed by Joshiy. The film stars Suresh Gopi, Priya Raman, Kanaka and Thilakan in the lead roles. The film has musical score by S. P. Venkatesh.

Plot
A revenge story of a harijan, Chindan (Don Bawa) who has internalized racist trauma of his childhood begotten from brahmin chieftains of the land, especially towards Mahendra Varma.

Cast
 
Suresh Gopi as Hariprasad a.k.a. Soorya
Priya Raman as Julie Williams
Kanaka as Lakshmi Hariprasad 
Thilakan as Chindan a.k.a. Bawa   
Narendra Prasad as Mahendra Varma 
Devan as Lawrence a.k.a. Krishna Varma 
Rajan P. Dev as Williams 
N. F. Varghese as Moosa 
Murali as Ravi Varma 
Sai Kumar as Sasi Varma 
Mohan Raj as Khader 
Bheeman Raghu as Anthony
Hemanth Ravan 
K. P. A. C. Azeez as Surendran, Jail Suprintendent 
Sukumari as Maggie 
Shammi Thilakan as Younger Chindan
Sona Nair as Meera 
Valsala Menon as Lakshmi's Mother 
Darshana as Nurse Susan

Release
The film was later dubbed and released in Tamil as Minnal.

References

External links

View the film
 BHOOPATHI Malayalam film

1997 films
1990s Malayalam-language films
Films directed by Joshiy